In mathematics, Itô's lemma or Itô's formula (also called the Itô-Doeblin formula, especially in French literature) is an identity used in Itô calculus to find the differential of a time-dependent function of a stochastic process. It serves as the stochastic calculus counterpart of the chain rule. It can be heuristically derived by forming the Taylor series expansion of the function up to its second derivatives and retaining terms up to first order in the time increment and second order in the Wiener process increment. The lemma is widely employed in mathematical finance, and its best known application is in the derivation of the Black–Scholes equation for option values.

Motivation 
Suppose we are given the stochastic differential equation

where  is a Wiener process and the functions  are deterministic (not stochastic) functions of time. In general, it's not possible to write a solution  directly in terms of  However, we can formally write an integral solution

However, sometimes we are faced with a stochastic differential equation for a more complex process  in which the process appears on both sides of the differential equation. That is, say

for some functions  and  In this case, we cannot immediately write a formal solution as we did for the simpler case above. Instead, we hope to write the process  as a function of a simpler process  taking the form above. That is, we want to identify three functions  and  such that  and  In practice, Ito's lemma is used in order to find this transformation. Finally, once we have transformed the problem into the simpler type of problem, we can determine the mean and higher moments of the process.

Informal derivation 

A formal proof of the lemma relies on taking the limit of a sequence of random variables. This approach is not presented here since it involves a number of technical details. Instead, we give a sketch of how one can derive Itô's lemma by expanding a Taylor series and applying the rules of stochastic calculus.

Suppose  is an Itô drift-diffusion process that satisfies the stochastic differential equation

where  is a Wiener process. 

If  is a twice-differentiable scalar function, its expansion in a Taylor series is

as required.

Mathematical formulation of Itô's lemma 
In the following subsections we discuss versions of Itô's lemma for different types of stochastic processes.

Itô drift-diffusion processes (due to: Kunita–Watanabe)
In its simplest form, Itô's lemma states the following: for an Itô drift-diffusion process

This immediately implies that  is itself an Itô drift-diffusion process.

In higher dimensions, if  is a vector of Itô processes such that

for a vector  and matrix , Itô's lemma then states that

where  is the gradient of  w.r.t. ,  is the Hessian matrix of  w.r.t.

Poisson jump processes 
We may also define functions on discontinuous stochastic processes.

Let  be the jump intensity. The Poisson process model for jumps is that the probability of one jump in the interval  is  plus higher order terms.  could be a constant, a deterministic function of time, or a stochastic process. The survival probability  is the probability that no jump has occurred in the interval . The change in the survival probability is

So

Let  be a discontinuous stochastic process. Write  for the value of S as we approach t from the left. Then

Let z be the magnitude of the jump and let  be the distribution of z. The expected magnitude of the jump is

Define , a compensated process and martingale, as

Then

Consider a function  of the jump process .

Itô's lemma for a process which is the sum of a drift-diffusion process and a jump process is just the sum of the Itô's lemma for the individual parts.

Non-continuous semimartingales 
Itô's lemma can also be applied to general -dimensional semimartingales, which need not be continuous. In general, a semimartingale is a càdlàg process, and an additional term needs to be added to the formula to ensure that the jumps of the process are correctly given by Itô's lemma.
Then, Itô's lemma states that if  is a -dimensional semimartingale and f is a twice continuously differentiable real valued function on  then f(X) is a semimartingale, and

This differs from the formula for continuous semi-martingales by the additional term summing over the jumps of X, which ensures that the jump of the right hand side at time  is Δf(Xt).

Multiple non-continuous jump processes 
There is also a version of this for a twice-continuously differentiable in space once in time function f evaluated at (potentially different) non-continuous semi-martingales which may be written as follows:

where  denotes the continuous part of the ith semi-martingale.

Examples

Geometric Brownian motion 
A process S is said to follow a geometric Brownian motion with constant volatility σ and constant drift μ if it satisfies the stochastic differential equation , for a Brownian motion B. Applying Itô's lemma with  gives

It follows that

exponentiating gives the expression for S,

The correction term of  corresponds to the difference between the median and mean of the log-normal distribution, or equivalently for this distribution, the geometric mean and arithmetic mean, with the median (geometric mean) being lower. This is due to the AM–GM inequality, and corresponds to the logarithm being concave (or convex upwards), so the correction term can accordingly be interpreted as a convexity correction. This is an infinitesimal version of the fact that the annualized return is less than the average return, with the difference proportional to the variance. See geometric moments of the log-normal distribution for further discussion.

The same factor of  appears in the d1 and d2 auxiliary variables of the Black–Scholes formula, and can be interpreted as a consequence of Itô's lemma.

Doléans-Dade exponential 
The Doléans-Dade exponential (or stochastic exponential) of a continuous semimartingale X can be defined as the solution to the SDE  with initial condition .
Applying Itô's lemma with f(Y) = log(Y) gives

Exponentiating gives the solution

Black–Scholes formula 
Itô's lemma can be used to derive the Black–Scholes equation for an option. Suppose a stock price follows a geometric Brownian motion given by the stochastic differential equation . Then, if the value of an option at time  is f(t, St), Itô's lemma gives

The term  represents the change in value in time dt of the trading strategy consisting of holding an amount  of the stock. If this trading strategy is followed, and any cash held is assumed to grow at the risk free rate r, then the total value V of this portfolio satisfies the SDE

This strategy replicates the option if V = f(t,S). Combining these equations gives the celebrated Black–Scholes equation

Product rule for Itô processes 
Let  be a two-dimensional Ito process with SDE:

We set  and observe that  and 

Substituting these values in the multi-dimensional version of the lemma gives us:

This is a generalisation of Leibniz's product rule to Ito processes, which are non-differentiable.

Further, using the second form of the multidimensional version above gives us

so we see that the product  is itself an Itô drift-diffusion process.

Itô's formula for functions with finite quadratic variation 
An idea by Hans Föllmer was to extend Itô's formula to functions with finite quadratic variation.

Let  be a real-valued function and  a RCLL function with finite quadratic variation. Then

See also 
Wiener process
Itô calculus
Feynman–Kac formula
Euler–Maruyama method

Notes

References 
Kiyosi Itô (1944). Stochastic Integral. Proc. Imperial Acad. Tokyo 20, 519–524. This is the paper with the Ito Formula; Online
Kiyosi Itô (1951). On stochastic differential equations. Memoirs, American Mathematical Society 4, 1–51. Online
Bernt Øksendal (2000). Stochastic Differential Equations. An Introduction with Applications, 5th edition, corrected 2nd printing. Springer. . Sections 4.1 and 4.2.
Philip E Protter (2005). Stochastic Integration and Differential Equations, 2nd edition. Springer. . Section 2.7.

External links 
Derivation, Prof. Thayer Watkins
Informal proof, optiontutor

Stochastic calculus
Lemmas in analysis
Equations
Probability theorems
Theorems in statistics
Lemmas